Kuwadzana is a residential suburb in Harare, Zimbabwe. It was originally known as Parkridge Fontainebleau. It lies on the city's western border, just south of the main Harare-Bulawayo road. In the 1980s, Kuwadzana was selected for slum upgrading on the site and services model. As of 2012, the population was 26,926.

References

Suburbs of Harare